The Lesser Poland people is a collection of the ethnographic groups of Polish people, that originate from the region of Lesser Poland. They speak in the Lesser Poland dialect of Polish language.

Groups 
The Lesser Poland people are divided into three subgroups. They are: Cracovian group, Sandomierz group, and Polish Highlanders.

The Cracovian group include: Cracovians, Vistulans, and Polish Uplanders. The Sandomierz group include Lasovians, Lublinians, Posaniaks, Rzeszovians, Sandomierz Borowiaks, and Sandomierzans. The Polish Highlanders include Babia Góra Gorals, Čadca Gorals, Kliszczaks, Łącko Gorals, Pieniny Gorals, Podhalans, Poprad Gorals, Sącz Gorals, Sącz Lachs, Spišans, Zagórzans, and Żywiec Gorals.

Citations

Notes

References 

Lesser Poland
Lechites
Polish people
Slavic ethnic groups
Ethnic groups in Poland